State Highway 162 (SH-162) is a state highway serving Lewis and Idaho counties in the North Central region of Idaho.

Route description

State Highway 162 begins at the intersection of Oak Street and Fourth Avenue, signed as State Highway 62 and State Highway 64, in Nezperce. SH-162 travels south on Oak Street and turns west for two blocks on 8th Avenue before leaving Nezperce for unincorporated Lewis County, headed into the Lawyer Creek valley. The highway enters Idaho County turns east to follow Meadow Creek Road until it reaches Winona, where SH-162 turns north along Sevenmile Creek. The roadway re-enters Lewis County and follows Lawyer Creek into Kamiah, becoming Pine Street at city limits. SH-162 turns east onto 5th Street for two blocks after at an intersection with SH-64, turning north once again at Hill Street. The highway ends at an intersection with U.S. Route 12 at 3rd Street.

History
The portion from Greencreek to Kamiah was once signed as SH-10 and then was renumbered to SH-62.

Major intersections

References

162
Transportation in Idaho County, Idaho
Transportation in Lewis County, Idaho